The Red Inn is a 1951 French comedy crime film directed by Claude Autant-Lara and starring Fernandel, Françoise Rosay and Julien Carette. It premiered on 19 October 1951. A remake of the film, directed by Gérard Krawczyk, premiered in 2007.

Plot
Set in 1833, it tells the story of how a monk visits the inn l'Auberge rouge in Peyrebeille, where the innkeeper confesses to a number of serious sins. The film is based on the actual crime case of the Peyrebeille Inn.

Production
The film was originally supposed to be an adaptation of Honoré de Balzac's 1831 short story The Red Inn ("L'auberge rouge"), as part of the commemoration to mark a hundred years since Balzac's death. When the financing encountered problems and took longer than expected, the filmmakers decided to keep the title, but change the project into a treatment of the events of the Auberge rouge in Peyrebeille, which are unrelated to Balzac's story.

The story had been filmed twice before, as a 1910 French silent film adapted by Abel Gance, and later as a 1923 film directed by Jean Epstein, with both of those earlier versions sticking much closer to the original story.

It was shot at the Billancourt Studios in Paris. The film's sets were designed by the art director Max Douy.

Cast
 Fernandel as the monk
 Françoise Rosay as Marie Martin
 Marie-Claire Olivia as Mathilde
 Jean-Roger Caussimon as Dauvin
 Nane Germon as Elisa
 Jacques Charon as Rodolphe
 Julien Carette as Pierre Martin
 Grégoire Aslan as Barbeuf	
 Andrée Viala as La Marquise De La Roche de Glun
 Didier D'yd as Janou
 Lud Germain as Fétiche
 Robert Berri as Le Cocher
 André Cheff as Le dandy
 André Dalibert as le bûcheron
 Manuel Gary as Un gendarme
 René Lefevre-Bel as Un gendarme

References

Bibliography
 Leahy, Sarah & Vanderschelden, Isabelle. Screenwriters in French cinema. Manchester University Press, 2021.

External links 
 

Films set in 1833
Films set in France
1950s crime comedy films
1950s historical comedy films
1951 films
Comedy films based on actual events
Crime films based on actual events
French crime comedy films
Films directed by Claude Autant-Lara
French historical comedy films
Films with screenplays by Jean Aurenche
Films with screenplays by Pierre Bost
French black-and-white films
Films shot at Billancourt Studios
1950s French films